The final of the men's discus throw event at the 1992 Summer Olympics in Barcelona, Spain was held on August 5, 1992. There were 32 participating athletes from 24 nations. The maximum number of athletes per nation had been set at 3 since the 1930 Olympic Congress. The top 12 and ties, and all those reaching 63.00 metres advanced to the final. The event was won by Romas Ubartas of Lithuania, a victory for the nation in its debut appearance in the men's discus throw. Jürgen Schult took silver, the first medal for unified Germany. Roberto Moya earned Cuba's first men's discus throw medal since 1980 with his bronze. Ubartas and Schult became the 11th and 12th men to win multiple discus throw medals; they had both represented different nations (the Soviet Union and East Germany, respectively, in 1988 and had finished one-two then as well, though in the opposite order.

Background

This was the 22nd appearance of the event, which is one of 12 athletics events to have been held at every Summer Olympics. The returning finalists from the 1988 Games were gold medalist Jürgen Schult of East Germany (now united Germany), silver medalist Romas Ubartas of the Soviet Union (now representing Lithuania), tenth-place finisher Mike Buncic of the United States, and twelfth-place finisher Imrich Bugár of Czechoslovakia. Ubartas had been the "top thrower in 1991" but "refused to compete at the 1991 Worlds for the Soviet Union"; with Lithuania sending its own team (not part of the United Team), he competed again. Schult was a strong contender to repeat, as was Lars Riedel, who won the 1991 world championship.

Bosnia and Herzegovina, the Central African Republic, the People's Republic of China, and Lithuania each made their debut in the men's discus throw; some former Soviet republics competed as the Unified Team. The United States made its 21st appearance, most of any nation, having missed only the boycotted 1980 Games.

Competition format

The competition used the two-round format introduced in 1936, with the qualifying round completely separate from the divided final. In qualifying, each athlete received three attempts; those recording a mark of at least 63.00 metres advanced to the final. If fewer than 12 athletes achieved that distance, the top 12 would advance. The results of the qualifying round were then ignored. Finalists received three throws each, with the top eight competitors receiving an additional three attempts. The best distance among those six throws counted.

Records

Prior to the competition, the existing world and Olympic records were as follows.

No new world or Olympic records were set during the competition.

Schedule

All times are Central European Summer Time (UTC+2)

Results

Qualifying

Final

See also
 1990 Men's European Championships Discus Throw
 1991 Men's World Championship Discus Throw
 1993 Men's World Championship Discus Throw
 1994 Men's European Championships Discus Throw

References

External links
 Official Report
 Results

D
Discus throw at the Olympics
Men's events at the 1992 Summer Olympics